Joseph McKenna (August 10, 1843 – November 21, 1926) was an American politician who served in all three branches of the U.S. federal government, as a member of the U.S. House of Representatives, as U.S. Attorney General and as an Associate Justice of the Supreme Court. He is one of seventeen members of the House of Representatives who subsequently served on the Supreme Court (including two Chief Justices).

Biography
Born in Philadelphia, Pennsylvania, the son of Irish Catholic immigrants, he attended St. Joseph's College and the Collegiate Institute in Benicia, California. After being admitted to the California bar in 1865, he became District Attorney for Solano County and then campaigned for and won a seat in the California State Assembly for two years (1875–1877). He retired after one term and an unsuccessful bid for Speaker.

After two unsuccessful attempts, McKenna was elected to the United States House of Representatives in 1885 and served for four terms. While in Congress, he was a "vehement proponent" of Chinese exclusion.

He was appointed to the Ninth Circuit Court of Appeals in 1892 by President Benjamin Harrison.

In 1897 he was appointed the 42nd Attorney General of the United States by President William McKinley, and served in that capacity until 1898.

McKenna was nominated by President McKinley on December 16, 1897, as an associate justice of the Supreme Court of the United States, to succeed Stephen Johnson Field. He was confirmed by the Senate on January 21, 1898, by a voice vote. He then took the judicial oath of office on January 26, 1898. Conscious of his limited credentials, McKenna attended Columbia Law School for about a month between his nomination and Senate confirmation to improve his legal education before taking his seat on the Court.

Although he never developed a consistent legal philosophy, McKenna was the author of a number of important decisions. One of the most notable was his opinion in the case of United States v. U.S. Steel Corporation (1920) which held that antitrust cases would be decided on the "rule of reason" principle—only alleged monopolistic combinations that are in unreasonable restraint of trade are illegal.

He authored 614 majority opinions, and 146 dissenting opinions during his time on the bench.  His passionate rebuttal to the denial of "pecuniary benefit" to a wife whose husband had been killed while working on the railroad was among those which brought a change to the Employer Liability Act. One of his most noteworthy opinions was Hipolite Egg Co. v. United States, 220 U.S. 45 (1911), in which a unanimous Court upheld the Pure Food and Drug Act of 1906.

In Hoke v. United States (1913), he concurred in upholding the Mann Act, a/k/a the "White-Slave Traffic Act". However, four years later, he dissented from the Court's opinion in Caminetti v. United States (1917), which held the act applied to private, noncommercial enticements to cross state lines for purposes of a sexual liaison. According to McKenna, the Act regulated only commercial vice, i.e., "immoralities having a mercenary purpose."

McKenna wrote Williams v. Mississippi, upholding the state's racist 1890 Constitution that disenfranchised nearly every African American in the state through poll taxes and literacy tests, while exempting whites through a grandfather clause.

While McKenna was generally quite favorable to federal power, he joined the Court's substantive due process jurisprudence and voted with the majority in 1905's Lochner v. New York, which struck down a state maximum-hours law for bakery workers. This decision carried broader implications for the scope of federal power, at least until the New Deal and the 1937 switch-in-time-that-saved-nine West Coast Hotel Co. v. Parrish. (See Judiciary Reorganization Bill of 1937.)

McKenna resigned from the Court in January 1925 at the suggestion of Chief Justice William Howard Taft. McKenna's ability to perform his duties had been diminished significantly by a stroke suffered 10 years earlier, and by the end of his tenure McKenna could not be counted on to write coherent opinions.

McKenna was one of 15 Catholic justices (out of the 115 total through the appointment of Justice Amy Coney Barrett) in the history of the Supreme Court.

McKenna married Amanda Borneman in 1869, and the couple had three daughters and one son. McKenna died on November 21, 1926. in Washington, D.C. His remains are interred at the city's Mount Olivet Cemetery.

See also

List of justices of the Supreme Court of the United States
List of United States Supreme Court cases by the Fuller Court
List of United States Supreme Court cases by the Taft Court
List of United States Supreme Court cases by the White Court

References

Further reading

 
 
 
 
 
 McKevitt, Brother Matthew (1946) Joseph McKenna: Associate Justice of the United States.

External links

Department of Justice, Joseph McKenna Attorney General.

Joseph McKenna at Supreme Court Historical Society.
Official Supreme Court media, Joseph McKenna at the Oyez project.

|-

|-

|-

|-

1843 births
1926 deaths
19th-century American judges
19th-century American politicians
20th-century American judges
American people of Irish descent
Burials at Mount Olivet Cemetery (Washington, D.C.)
Judges of the United States Court of Appeals for the Ninth Circuit
McKinley administration cabinet members
Republican Party members of the California State Assembly
Politicians from Philadelphia
People from Solano County, California
Republican Party members of the United States House of Representatives from California
Columbia Law School alumni
Saint Joseph's University alumni
United States Attorneys General
United States federal judges appointed by Benjamin Harrison
United States federal judges appointed by William McKinley
Justices of the Supreme Court of the United States
Catholics from California
Catholics from Pennsylvania